Victor is an unincorporated community in Indian Creek Township, Monroe County, in the U.S. state of Indiana.

History
Victor is the home of Victor Oolitic Stone Company, a limestone quarry and limestone fabricator in existence since 1898. A location between near Victor and Harrodsburg on Clear Creek was chosen by Col. John Ketcham for his home and grist mill.

Geography
Victor is approximately 10 miles southeast of Bloomington and 8 miles northeast of Harrodsburg at the junction of W. Milton Road and S. Victor Pike.

References

Unincorporated communities in Monroe County, Indiana
Unincorporated communities in Indiana
Bloomington metropolitan area, Indiana